Lernik Papyan (born October 26, 1966 in Vanadzor, Lori Province, Armenian SSR) is a retired boxer from Armenia. He represented his native country at the 1996 Summer Olympics in Atlanta, Georgia in the men's flyweight (51 kg) division. Papyan lost in the second round to eventual gold medalist Maikro Romero of Cuba. Earlier, Papyan represented the Soviet Union at the 1986 Goodwill Games.

References

External links
Sports-Reference.com

1966 births
Living people
People from Vanadzor
Soviet male boxers
Soviet Armenians
Flyweight boxers
Olympic boxers of Armenia
Boxers at the 1996 Summer Olympics
Armenian male boxers
Competitors at the 1986 Goodwill Games